Caloptilia spinulosa is a moth of the family Gracillariidae. It is known from Jiangxi, China.

References

spinulosa
Moths of Asia
Moths described in 1990